The Iraq and Syria Genocide Relief and Accountability Act of 2018 is a law to provide humanitarian relief to victims of the genocide perpetrated by the Islamic State of Iraq and the Levant (ISIS) during the Syrian and Iraqi Civil Wars. It also holds ISIS accountable as perpetrators of genocide.

According to Representative Chris Smith, who introduced the bill with Representative Anna Eshoo, the "blueprint for the legislation" was testimony provided by Supreme Knight of the Knights of Columbus Carl A. Anderson before Congress in 2016.  Smith praised the Knights as "unflagging supporters of the bill."

See also
 Political activity of the Knights of Columbus

References

Acts of the 115th United States Congress